Events in the year 2019 in Senegal.

Incumbents
 President: Macky Sall 
 Prime Minister: Mahammed Dionne

Events

February 24 – President Macky Sall wins a second term with 58% of the vote in the 2019 Senegalese presidential election.
July 29 — Journalist Adama Gaye (Kapital Afrik, Jeune Afrique, France 24, TV5Monde, and Al Jazeera) is arrested and charged with acting to compromise public security and offending the president.
September 27 — The opening of Massalikoul Djinane Mosque.
September 29 — President Macky Sall pardons his rival, the former mayor of Dakar, Khalifa Sall, who was jailed in 2018 for corruption.
November 19 – West Africa's largest mosque opens in Touba at a cost of US $50 million.
December 11 – Music legend Baaba Maal, who was born in Podor promises to fight to stop the desertification in the Sahel by planting trees.
December 24 – Midnight mass is celebrated as the first event leading to the reopening of the Cathedral of Saint Louis, the first Christian Church in West Africa, in the city of Saint-Louis, Senegal.

Deaths

18 February – Kor Sarr, footballer (b. 1975).
1 March – Maïmouna Kane, politician (b. 1937).
18 November – Colette Senghor, 93, wife of Léopold Sédar Senghor, died in Verson, Normandy, France.

References

 
2010s in Senegal
Years of the 21st century in Senegal
Senegal
Senegal